Old Persian cuneiform is a semi-alphabetic cuneiform script that was the primary script for Old Persian. Texts written in this cuneiform have been found in Iran (Persepolis, Susa, Hamadan, Kharg Island), Armenia, Romania (Gherla), Turkey (Van Fortress), and along the Suez Canal. They were mostly inscriptions from the time period of Darius I, such as the DNa inscription, as well as his son, Xerxes I. Later kings down to Artaxerxes III used more recent forms of the language classified as "pre-Middle Persian".

History
Old Persian cuneiform is loosely inspired by the Sumero-Akkadian cuneiform; however, only one glyph is directly derived from it – l(a), from la. (la did not occur in native Old Persian words, but was found in Akkadian borrowings.)

Scholars today mostly agree that the Old Persian script was invented by about 525 BC to provide monument inscriptions for the Achaemenid king Darius I, to be used at Behistun. While a few Old Persian texts seem to be inscribed during the reigns of Cyrus the Great (CMa, CMb, and CMc, all found at Pasargadae), the first Achaemenid emperor, or Arsames and Ariaramnes (AsH and AmH, both found at Hamadan), grandfather and great-grandfather of Darius I, all five, specially the later two, are generally agreed to have been later inscriptions.

Around the time period in which Old Persian was used, nearby languages included Elamite and Akkadian. One of the main differences between the writing systems of these languages is that Old Persian is a semi-alphabet while Elamite and Akkadian were syllabic. In addition, while Old Persian is written in a consistent semi-alphabetic system, Elamite and Akkadian used borrowings from other languages, creating mixed systems.

Decipherment
Old Persian cuneiform was only deciphered by a series of guesses, in the absence of bilingual documents connecting it to a known language. Various characteristics of sign series, such as length or recurrence of signs, allowed researchers to hypothesize about their meaning, and to discriminate between the various possible historically known kings, and then to create a correspondence between each cuneiform and a specific sound.

Archaeological records of cuneiform inscriptions

The first mention of ancient inscriptions in the newly-discovered ruins of Persepolis was made by the Spain and Portugal ambassador to Persia, Antonio de Goueca in a 1611 publication. Various travelers then made attempts at illustrating these new inscription, which in 1700 Thomas Hyde first called "cuneiform", but deemed were no more than decorative friezes.

Proper attempts at deciphering Old Persian cuneiform started with faithful copies of cuneiform inscriptions, which first became available in 1711 when duplicatas of Darius's inscriptions were published by Jean Chardin. Around 1764, Carsten Niebuhr visited the ruins of Persepolis, and was able to make excellent copies of the inscriptions, identifying "three different alphabets". His faithful copies of the cuneiform inscriptions at Persepolis proved to be a key turning-point in the decipherment of cuneiform, and the birth of Assyriology.

The set of characters that would later be known as Old Persian cuneiform, was soon perceived as being the simplest of the various types of cuneiform scripts that has been encountered, and because of this was understood as a prime candidate for decipherment. Niebuhr identified that there were only 42 characters in this category of inscriptions, which he named "Class I", and affirmed that this must therefore be an alphabetic script.

Münter guesses the word for "king" (1802)

In 1802, Friedrich Münter confirmed that "Class I" characters (today called "Old Persian cuneiform") were probably alphabetical, also because of the small number of different signs forming inscriptions. He proved that they belonged to the Achaemenid Empire, which led to the suggestion that the inscriptions were in the Old Persian language and probably mentioned Achaemenid kings. He identified a highly recurring group of characters in these inscriptions: . Because of its high recurrence and length, he guessed that this must be the word for "king" (which he guessed must be pronounced kh-sha-a-ya-th-i-ya, now known to be pronounced in Old Persian xšāyaθiya). He guessed correctly, but that would only be known for sure several decades later. Münter also understood that each word was separated from the next by a backslash sign.

Grotefend guesses the names of individual rulers (1802–1815)

Grotefend extended this work by realizing, based on the known inscriptions of much later rulers (the Pahlavi inscriptions of the Sasanian emperors), that a king's name is often followed by "great king, king of kings" and the name of the king's father. This understanding of the structure of monumental inscriptions in Old Persian was based on the work of Anquetil-Duperron, who had studied Old Persian through the Zoroastrian Avestas in India, and Antoine Isaac Silvestre de Sacy, who had decrypted the monumental Pahlavi inscriptions of the Sasanian emperors.

Grotefend focused on two inscriptions from Persepolis, called the "Niebuhr inscriptions", which seemed to use the words "King" and "King of Kings" guessed by Münter, and which seemed to have broadly similar content except for what he thought must be the names of kings:

Looking at similarities in character sequences, he made the hypothesis that the father of the ruler in one inscription would possibly appear as the first name in the other inscription: the first word in Niebuhr 1 indeed corresponded to the 6th word in Niebuhr 2.

Looking at the length of the character sequences, and comparing with the names and genealogy of the Achaemenid kings as known from the Greeks, also taking into account the fact that the father of one of the rulers in the inscriptions didn't have the attribute "king", he made the correct guess that this could be no other than Darius the Great, his father Hystapes, who was not a king, and his son the famous Xerxes. The inscriptions were made around this time; there were only two instances where a ruler came to power without being a previous king's son. They were Darius the Great and Cyrus the Great, both of whom became emperor by revolt. The deciding factors between these two choices were the names of their fathers and sons. Darius's father was Hystaspes and his son was Xerxes, while Cyrus' father was Cambyses I and his son was Cambyses II. Within the text, the father and son of the king had different groups of symbols for names so Grotefend assumed that the king must have been Darius.

These connections allowed Grotefend to figure out the cuneiform characters that are part of Darius, Darius's father Hystaspes, and Darius's son Xerxes. He equated the letters  with the name d-a-r-h-e-u-sh for Darius, as known from the Greeks. This identification was correct, although the actual Persian spelling was da-a-ra-ya-va-u-sha, but this was unknown at the time. Grotefend similarly equated the sequence  with kh-sh-h-e-r-sh-e for Xerxes, which again was right, but the actual Old Persian transcription was kha-sha-ya-a-ra-sha-a. Finally, he matched the sequence of the father who was not a king  with Hystaspes, but again with the supposed Persian reading of g-o-sh-t-a-s-p, rather than the actual Old Persian vi-i-sha-ta-a-sa-pa.

By this method, Grotefend had correctly identified each king in the inscriptions, but his identification of the phonetical value of individual letters was still quite defective, for want of a better understanding of the Old Persian language itself. Grotefend only identified correctly the phonetical value of eight letters among the thirty signs he had collated.

Guessing whole sentences
Grotefend made further guesses about the remaining words in the inscriptions, and endeavoured to rebuild probable sentences. Again relying on deductions only, and without knowing the actual script or language, Grotefend guessed a complete translation of the Xerxes inscription (Niebuhr inscription 2): "Xerxes the strong King, King of Kings, son of Darius the King, ruler of the world" ("Xerxes Rex fortis, Rex regum, Darii Regis Filius, orbis rector"). In effect, he achieved a fairly close translation, as the modern translation is: "Xerxes the Great King, King of Kings, son of Darius the King, an Achaemenian".

Grotefend's contribution to Old Persian is unique in that he did not have comparisons between Old Persian and known languages, as opposed to the decipherment of the Egyptian hieroglyphics and the Rosetta Stone. All his decipherments were done by comparing the texts with known history. However groundbreaking, this inductive method failed to convince academics, and the official recognition of his work was denied for nearly a generation. Grotefend published his deductions in 1802, but they were dismissed by the academic community.

Vindication

It was only in 1823 that Grotefend's discovery was confirmed, when the French archaeologist Champollion, who had just deciphered Egyptian hieroglyphs, was able to read the Egyptian dedication of a quadrilingual hieroglyph-cuneiform inscription on an alabaster vase in the Cabinet des Médailles, the "Caylus vase". The Egyptian inscription on the vase was in the name of King Xerxes I, and Champollion, together with the orientalist Antoine-Jean Saint-Martin, was able to confirm that the corresponding words in the cuneiform script were indeed the words which Grotefend had identified as meaning "king" and "Xerxes" through guesswork. The findings were published by Saint-Martin in Extrait d'un mémoire relatif aux antiques inscriptions de Persépolis lu à l'Académie des Inscriptions et Belles Lettres, thereby vindicating the pioneering work of Grotefend.

More advances were made on Grotefend's work and by 1847, most of the symbols were correctly identified. A basis had now been laid for the interpretation of the Persian inscriptions. However, lacking knowledge of old Persian, Grotefend misconstrued several important characters. Significant work remained to be done to complete the decipherment. Building on Grotefend's insights, this task was performed by Eugène Burnouf, Christian Lassen and Sir Henry Rawlinson.

The decipherment of the Old Persian Cuneiform script was at the beginning of the decipherment of all the other cuneiform scripts, as various multi-lingual inscriptions between the various cuneiform scripts were obtained from archaeological discoveries. The decipherment of Old Persian was the starting point for the decipherment of Elamite, Babylonian and Akkadian (predecessor of Babylonian), especially through the multi-lingual Behistun Inscription, and ultimately Sumerian through Akkadian-Sumerian bilingual tablets.

Signs
Most scholars consider the writing system to be an independent invention because it has no obvious connections with other writing systems at the time, such as Elamite, Akkadian, Hurrian, and Hittite cuneiforms. While Old Persian's basic strokes are similar to those found in cuneiform scripts, Old Persian texts were engraved on hard materials, so the engravers had to make cuts that imitated the forms easily made on clay tablets. The signs are composed of horizontal, vertical, and angled wedges. There are four basic components and new signs are created by adding wedges to these basic components. These four basic components are two parallel wedges without angle, three parallel wedges without angle, one wedge without angle and an angled wedge, and two angled wedges. The script is written from left to right.

The script encodes three vowels, a, i, u, and twenty-two consonants, k, x, g, c, ç, j, t, θ, d, p, f, b, n, m, y, v, r, l, s, z, š, and h. Old Persian contains two sets of consonants: those whose shape depends on the following vowel and those whose shape is independent of the following vowel. The consonant symbols that depend on the following vowel act like the consonants in Devanagari. Vowel diacritics are added to these consonant symbols to change the inherent vowel or add length to the inherent vowel. However, the vowel symbols are usually still included so [di] would be written as [di] [i] even though [di] already implies the vowel. For the consonants whose shape does not depend on the following vowels, the vowel signs must be used after the consonant symbol.

Compared to the Avestan alphabet Old Persian notably lacks voiced fricatives, but includes the sign ç (of uncertain pronunciation) and a sign for the non-native l. Notably, in common with the Brahmic scripts, there appears to be no distinction between a consonant followed by an a and a consonant followed by nothing.

logograms:
xšāyaθiya "king": 
dahyāuš- "country": , 
baga- "god": 
būmiš- "earth": 
word divider: 
numerals:
1 , 2 , 5 , 7 , 8 , 9 
10 , 12 , 13 , 14 , 15 , 18 , 19 , 20 , 22 , 23 , 25 , 26 , 27 , 40 , 60 ,
120

Alphabetic properties

Although based on a logo-syllabic prototype, all vowels but short /a/ are written and so the system is essentially an alphabet. There are three vowels, long and short. Initially, no distinction is made for length:  a or ā,  i or ī,  u or ū. However, as in the Brahmic scripts, short a is not written after a consonant:  h or ha,  hā,  hi or hī,  hu or hū. (Old Persian is not considered an abugida because vowels are represented as full letters.)

Thirteen out of twenty-two consonants, such as  h(a), are invariant, regardless of the following vowel (that is, they are alphabetic), while only six have a distinct form for each consonant-vowel combination (that is, they are syllabic), and among these, only d and m occur in three forms for all three vowels:  d or da,  dā,  di or dī,  du or dū. (k, g do not occur before i, and j, v do not occur before u, so these consonants only have two forms each.)

Sometimes medial long vowels are written with a y or v, as in Semitic:  dī,  dū. Diphthongs are written by mismatching consonant and vowel:  dai, or sometimes, in cases where the consonant does not differentiate between vowels, by writing the consonant and both vowel components:  cišpaiš (gen. of name Cišpi- 'Teispes').

In addition, three consonants, t, n, and r, are partially syllabic, having the same form before a and i, and a distinct form only before u:  n or na,  nā,  ni or nī,  nu or nū.

The effect is not unlike the English  sound, which is typically written g before i or e, but j before other vowels (gem, jam), or the Castilian Spanish  sound, which is written c before i or e and z before other vowels (cinco, zapato): it is more accurate to say that some of the Old Persian consonants are written by different letters depending on the following vowel, rather than classifying the script as syllabic. This situation had its origin in Assyrian cuneiform, where several syllabic distinctions had been lost and were often clarified with explicit vowels. However, in the case of Assyrian, the vowel was not always used, and was never used where not needed, so the system remained (logo-)syllabic.

For a while it was speculated that the alphabet could have had its origin in such a system, with a leveling of consonant signs a millennium earlier producing something like the Ugaritic alphabet, but today it is generally accepted that the Semitic alphabet arose from Egyptian hieroglyphs, where vowel notation was not important. (See Proto-Sinaitic script.)

Unicode

Old Persian cuneiform was added to the Unicode Standard in March 2005 with the release of version 4.1.

The Unicode block for Old Persian cuneiform is U+103A0–U+103DF and is in the Supplementary Multilingual Plane:

Notes and references

Sources

Further reading

External links

Fonts
 Download "Kakoulookiam", Old Persian Cuneiform Font (Unicode)
 Download "Khosrau", Old Persian Cuneiform Font (Unicode)
 Download "Behistun", Old Persian Cuneiform Font (Unicode)
Download Old Persian & Avestan Fonts
 Old Persian Cuneiform Unicode Test Page (install one of the above fonts and see this page)
 Unicode Problems (learn how to configure your browser)

Texts

Achaemenid Royal Inscriptions (Livius.org)

Descriptions
Omniglot article on Old Persian cuneiform
Ancient scripts article on Old Persian cuneiform
Old Persian cuneiform in contrast with Elamite and Late Babylonian cuneiform

Persian orthography
Old Persian language
Obsolete writing systems
Syllabary writing systems
Alphabets
Cuneiform
Persian scripts